The Journal of Applied Physiology is a monthly peer-reviewed medical journal of physiology published by the American Physiological Society. The journal was established in 1948, and is currently edited by Sue Bodine. According to the Journal Citation Reports, the journal has a 2020 impact factor of 3.531.

References

External links
 

Physiology journals
Publications established in 1948
English-language journals
Monthly journals